Bersheba Fristoe Younger, born Bersheba Leighton Fristoe (June 6, 1816 – June 6, 1870) was an American woman who was the mother of the famed Younger Outlaws Cole, Jim, John and Bob. She was born in McMinnville, Tennessee, the daughter of judge Richard Marshall Fristoe and Mary L. Fristoe. (née Sullivan) She married Henry Washington Younger in about 1830 and bore 14 children from 1832 to 1857.

Throughout the 1860s she suffered many tragedies; in 1862 Henry was shot dead. He was brought home and buried in an unmarked grave. Also the Younger boys were being targeted because of Cole's involvement with the Missouri guerillas.

After she was forced to leave her house and she witnessed her son John kill a man, the family moved to Texas. By this time Bersheba had become quite ill, so they brought her back to Lee's Summit, Missouri, to die. Some men recognized John and Bob Younger as Cole's brothers, they knocked Bob unconscious and took John out back and hung him 4 times, hitting him until he was unconscious.

This ordeal was too much for Bersheba and she died on 6 June 1870, her 54th birthday.

External links
Younger family genealogy on the official website for the family of Jesse James: Stray Leaves, A James Family in America Since 1650

1816 births
1870 deaths
James–Younger Gang